Hugh G. Rection may refer to:

 a fictional character in Screwballs II
 a fictional reference in "Sign here", an episode of Beavis and Butt-Head
 a ring name of wrestler Bill DeMott

See also
 Gag name